Pehrest-e Sofla (also Romanized as Pehrest-e Soflá; also known as Pahrast-e Soflá) is a village in Bala Deh Rural District, Beyram District, Larestan County, Fars Province, Iran. At the 2006 census, its population was 172, in 42 families.

References 

Populated places in Larestan County